The Europe/Africa Zone is one of three zones of regional competition in the 2016 Fed Cup.

Group I 
 Venue: Municipal Tennis Centre, Eilat, Israel (outdoor hard)
 Date: 3–6 February

The fourteen teams were divided into two pools of three teams and two pools of four teams. The four pool winners will take part in play-offs to determine the two nations advancing to the World Group II play-offs. The nations finishing last in their pools will take part in relegation play-offs, with the two losing nations being relegated to Group II for 2017.

Pools

Play-offs

Final placements 

Group II 
 Venue: Gezira Sporting Club, Cairo, Egypt (outdoor clay)
 Dates: 13–16 April

The seven teams will be divided into two pools, one of three teams and one of four teams. The two nations placing first and second will take part in play-offs to determine the two nations advancing to Group I. The nations finishing last in their pools will take part in relegation play-offs, with the two losing nations being relegated to Group III for 2017. Slovenia chose to withdraw due to security concerns.

Pools

Play-offs

Final placements 

Group III 

 Venue: Bellevue, Ulcinj, Montenegro (outdoor clay)
 Dates: 11–16 April

The seventeen teams will be divided into three pools of four teams and one pool of five teams. The four pool winners will take part in play-offs to determine the two nations advancing to Group II for 2017.

Pools

Play-offs

Final placements 

References 

 Fed Cup Result, 2016 Europe/Africa Group I
 Fed Cup Result, 2016 Europe/Africa Group II
 Fed Cup Result, 2016 Europe/Africa Group III

External links 
 Fed Cup website

 
Europe Africa
Tennis tournaments in Israel
Tennis tournaments in Montenegro